A ladder is a runged climbing aid.

Ladder, The Ladder, or Ladders may also refer to:

Art, entertainment and media

Film and television
"Ladders" (Community), the first episode of the sixth season of the sitcom Community
 Ladders, a 2004 documentary narrated by Harry Belafonte
The Ladder, a mythical burning ladder that is a Meyerism cornerstone and the theme of Cal Roberts's motivational practice in The Path (TV series)

Games
 Ladder (Go), a formation in the game of Go
 Ladder (video game), a clone of Donkey Kong, written for the CP/M operating system

Music 
 Ladders (band), an American band
 The Ladder (band), a British band
 The Ladder EP, a 2008 extended play by the British band The Ladder
 The Ladder (Yes album), a 1999 album by Yes
 The Ladder, a 2010 album by Andrew Belle
 "Ladders", a song by Leona Lewis from her 2015 album I Am
 "Ladders", a song by Mac Miller song from his 2018 album Swimming
 "The Ladder", song by John Zorn from The Art of Memory (album)
 "The Ladder", a song by Prince on his 1985 album Around the World in a Day

Publications 
The Ladder, by Halfdan Rasmussen
 The Ladder (magazine), a US publication for lesbians

Career-related
Ladder, a career path and reference to organizational and industry hierarchy
TheLadders, a careers website

Finance
 Ladder (option combination), a combination of three options
 Ladder (exotic option), a type of exotic option

Science and technology 
 DNA ladder, a molecular-weight size marker used in gel electrophoresis
 Ladder frame, a vehicle frame type
 Ladder logic, a philosophy of drawing electrical logic schematics
 Ladder operator, a mathematical entity used in quantum mechanics
 Resistor ladder, an analogue circuit

Sports
 Ladder tournament, a type of game or sports tournament
 League table or ladder, a chart or table which compares sports teams, or other entities, by ranking them in order of ability or achievement

Other uses
 Ladder, a vertical split in the fabric of a pair of tights (in UK terminology; "a run in pantyhose" is the US equivalent)
 Jacob's Ladder, a "ladder to heaven" described by biblical Jacob in the Book of Genesis
 Laddering, an investment technique
Wittgenstein's Ladder, also called Lie-to-children

See also
  Jacob's Ladder (disambiguation)